Clyde Owen "C. O." Braden (November 5, 1891 – August 22, 1969) was an American football coach.  He was the first head football coach at Dickinson State College—now known as Dickinson State University–in Dickinson, North Dakota and held that position for two seasons, from 1925 until 1926.  His coaching record at Dickinson State 1–1.

Braden also served as Dean of Men at the college in 1924. In 1926, Braden returned to Kansas City, Missouri to work in the insurance business.

References

External links
 

1891 births
1969 deaths
Dickinson State Blue Hawks football coaches
People from Baldwin City, Kansas